Oblinger is a surname. Notable people with the surname include:

Alexander Oblinger (born 1989), Polish-born German ice hockey player
Helmut Oblinger (born 1973), Austrian slalom canoeist
James L. Oblinger (born 1945), American Professor of Food Science and Human Nutrition and Chancellor of North Carolina State University
Josephine Oblinger (1913–1998), American lawyer and politician
Violetta Oblinger-Peters (born 1977), German-born Austrian slalom canoeist